This is a list of existing public aquariums in the United States, some of which are unaccredited.  For zoos, see List of zoos in the United States.

Aquariums are facilities where animals are confined within tanks and displayed to the public, and in which they may also be bred. Such facilities include public aquariums, oceanariums, marine mammal parks, and dolphinariums.

Alabama 

 Alabama Aquarium at Dauphin Island Sea Lab - Dauphin Island

Alaska 

Alaska SeaLife Center - Seward
Sitka Sound Science Center - Sitka

Arizona 

OdySea Aquarium - Scottsdale
Sea Life Arizona - Tempe

California

Aquarium of the Bay - San Francisco
Aquarium of the Pacific - Long Beach
Birch Aquarium - La Jolla
Cabrillo Marine Aquarium - San Pedro
Central Coast Aquarium - Avila Beach
Monterey Bay Aquarium - Monterey
Ocean World - Crescent City
Roundhouse Aquarium - Manhattan Beach
Santa Barbara Museum of Natural History Sea Center - Santa Barbara
Santa Monica Pier Aquarium - Santa Monica
Sea Life California - Carlsbad
SeaQuest Folsom - Folsom
SeaWorld San Diego - San Diego
Seymour Marine Discovery Center - Santa Cruz
Steinhart Aquarium (California Academy of Sciences) - San Francisco

Colorado 

 Downtown Aquarium - Denver
 SeaQuest Littleton - Littleton

Connecticut 

 Maritime Aquarium at Norwalk - Norwalk
 Mystic Aquarium - Mystic
 SeaQuest Trumbull - Trumbull

District of Columbia 

 Sant Ocean Hall - Washington, D.C.

Florida 

Clearwater Marine Aquarium - Clearwater
Dolphin Research Center - Grassy Key
Florida Aquarium - Tampa
Florida Keys Aquarium Encounters - Marathon
Gulf Specimen Marine Laboratory, Inc - Panacea
Gulfarium Marine Adventure Park - Fort Walton Beach
Gulf World Marine Park - Panama City Beach
Key West Aquarium - Key West
Marineland of Florida - Marineland
Miami Seaquarium - Miami
Mote Marine Laboratory - Sarasota
Phillip and Patricia Frost Museum of Science - Miami
Pier Aquarium - St. Petersburg'
Sea Life Orlando Aquarium - Orlando
SeaQuest Fort Lauderdale - Fort Lauderdale
SeaWorld Orlando - Orlando
South Florida Science Center and Aquarium - West Palm Beach
St. Augustine Aquarium
The Seas with Nemo & Friends - Bay Lake
The Turtle Hospital - Marathon
Tarpon Springs Aquarium - Tarpon Springs

Georgia 

 Flint RiverQuarium - Albany
 Georgia Aquarium - Atlanta

Hawaii 

Maui Ocean Center - Maui
Sea Life Park Hawaii - Honolulu
Waikiki Aquarium - Honolulu

Idaho 

 Aquarium of Boise - Boise
 East Idaho Aquarium - Idaho Falls

Illinois 

 Shedd Aquarium - Chicago

Iowa 

 National Mississippi River Museum & Aquarium - Dubuque

Kentucky 

 Newport Aquarium - Newport

Louisiana 

 Audubon Aquarium of the Americas - New Orleans
 Natchitoches National Fish Hatchery and Aquarium - Natchitoches
 Shreveport Aquarium - Shreveport

Maine 

 Gulf of Maine Research Institute - Portland
 Maine Aquarium - Saco (closed; plans for re-opening dependent on fundraising)
 Mount Desert Oceanarium - Bar Harbor
 Maine State Aquarium - Boothbay Harbor

Maryland 

 Calvert Marine Museum - Solomons
 Glen Echo Park Aquarium - Glen Echo
 National Aquarium - Baltimore
 Ocean City Life-Saving Station Museum - Ocean City

Massachusetts 

 Berkshire Museum - Pittsfield
 Cape Cod Museum of Natural History - Brewster
 Maria Mitchell Aquarium - Nantucket
 New England Aquarium - Boston
 Woods Hole Science Aquarium - Woods Hole

Michigan 

 Belle Isle Aquarium - Detroit
 John Ball Zoological Garden - Grand Rapids
 Michigan Sea Life Aquarium - Auburn Hills

Minnesota 

 Great Lakes Aquarium - Duluth
 Sea Life Minnesota Aquarium - Bloomington
Discovery Bay at Minnesota Zoo - Apple Valley
SeaQuest Minnesota - Roseville

Mississippi 

Institute for Marine Mammal Studies - Gulfport
Mississippi Aquarium
Mississippi Museum of Natural Science - Jackson
Ocean Adventures Marine Park - Gulfport

Missouri 

Aquarium At The Boardwalk - Branson (Opening in 2020–2021)
Sea Life Kansas City - Kansas City
 St Louis Aquarium at Union Station - St Louis
 World Aquarium - St. Louis
Wonders of Wildlife Museum & Aquarium - Springfield

Montana

Scheels - Billings

Nebraska 

 Schramm Education Center - Schramm Park State Recreation Area, Omaha
 Omaha's Henry Doorly Zoo and Aquarium - Omaha

Nevada 

 SeaQuest Las Vegas - Las Vegas
 Siegfried & Roy's Secret Garden and Dolphin Habitat - Las Vegas
 Shark Reef at Mandalay Bay - Las Vegas
 The Aquarium at the Silverton Hotel - Las Vegas

New Hampshire

 Explore the Ocean World Oceanarium - Hampton
 Seacoast Science Center - Rye

New Jersey 

 Adventure Aquarium - Camden
 Atlantic City Aquarium - Atlantic City
 Jenkinson's Aquarium - Point Pleasant Beach
 Marine Mammal Stranding Center - Brigantine
 Sea Life New Jersey Aquarium - East Rutherford
 Seaport Aquarium - Wildwood
 SeaQuest Woodbridge - Woodbridge

New Mexico 

 ABQ BioPark Aquarium - Albuquerque

New York 

 Aquarium of Niagara - Niagara Falls
 Cold Spring Harbor Fish Hatchery & Aquarium - Cold Spring Harbor
 Long Island Aquarium and Exhibition Center - Riverhead
 New York Aquarium - Brooklyn
 VIA Aquarium - Schenectady

North Carolina 

 Aquarium & Shark Lab by Team ECCO - Hendersonville
 Discovery Place - Charlotte
 North Carolina at Fort Fisher - Kure Beach
 North Carolina at Pine Knoll Shores - Pine Knoll Shores
 North Carolina Aquarium on Roanoke Island - Roanoke Island
 SciQuarium - Greensboro
 Sea Life Charlotte-Concord Aquarium - Concord

Ohio 

 Columbus Zoo and Aquarium - Columbus
 Greater Cleveland Aquarium - Cleveland
 Toledo Zoo and Aquarium - Toledo

Oklahoma 

 Oklahoma Aquarium - Jenks
 Medicine Park Aquarium - Medicine Park

Oregon 

 Charleston Marine Life Center - Coos Bay
 Hatfield Marine Science Center - Newport
 Oregon Coast Aquarium - Newport
 Oregon Undersea Gardens - Newport
 Seaside Aquarium - Seaside

Pennsylvania 

 Electric City Aquarium & Reptile Den - Scranton
 Pittsburgh Zoo & PPG Aquarium - Pittsburgh

Rhode Island 

Biomes Marine Biology Center - North Kingstown
Save the Bay The Exploration Center and Aquarium - Newport

South Carolina 

 Ripley's Aquarium of Myrtle Beach - Myrtle Beach
 South Carolina Aquarium - Charleston

South Dakota 

Butterfly House & Aquarium - Sioux Falls
Gavins Point National Fish Hatchery - Yankton
The Outdoor Campus - Rapid City

Tennessee 

Aquarium inside Memphis Zoo - Memphis
Aquarium Restaurant - Nashville
Ripley's Aquarium of the Smokies - Gatlinburg
Tennessee Aquarium - Chattanooga
Tennessee Aquarium Conservation Institute - Chattanooga

Texas 

 Austin Aquarium - Austin
 Aquarium Restaurant - Kemah
 Children's Aquarium at Fair Park - Dallas
 Dallas World Aquarium - Dallas
 Downtown Aquarium - Houston
 Kipp Aquarium - Houston
 Moody Gardens Aquarium - Galveston
 Richard Friedrich Aquarium - San Antonio
 San Antonio Aquarium - Leon Valley
 Sea Center Texas - Lake Jackson
 Sea Life San Antonio Aquarium - San Antonio (opening spring 2020)
 SeaQuest Fort Worth - Fort Worth 
 SeaWorld San Antonio - San Antonio
 Seven Seas Marine Life Park - Arlington
 Texas Freshwater Fisheries Center - Athens
 Texas State Aquarium - Corpus Christi

Utah 

 Loveland Living Planet Aquarium - Draper
 SeaQuest Utah - Layton

Vermont 

 ECHO, Leahy Center for Lake Champlain - Burlington
 Montshire Museum of Science - Norwich

Virginia 

 Virginia Aquarium & Marine Science Center - Virginia Beach
 Virginia Living Museum - Newport News

Washington

 MaST Center Aquarium - Des Moines
 Marine Life Center - Bellingham
 Point Defiance Zoo & Aquarium - Tacoma
 Port Townsend Marine Science Center - Port Townsend
 Puget Sound Estuarium - Olympia
 SEA Discovery Center - Poulsbo
 Seattle Aquarium - Seattle
 Westport Aquarium - Westport

Wisconsin 

 Beaver Springs Fishing Park - Wisconsin Dells
 Discovery World - Milwaukee

See also 

 List of aquaria
 List of AZA member zoos and aquariums
 List of CAZA member zoos and aquariums
 List of dolphinariums
 List of nature centers in the United States
 List of zoos in the United States

References 

 Public Aquaria, Fins: The Fish Information Service, Actwin.com, 2000, retrieved on: June 22, 2007

United States
Aquaria
Aquaria